Events from the year 1876 in Russia

Incumbents
 Monarch – Alexander II

Events

  Constitution and Convention of the International Telecommunication Union
 Treaty of Saint Petersburg (1875)
 Akinchi

Births
 January 11 – Reinhold Glière, composer (d. 1956)
 October 18 – Vyacheslav Troyanov, general (d. 1918)

Deaths

References

1875 in Russia
Years of the 19th century in the Russian Empire